Lazy linear hybrid automata model the discrete time behavior of control systems containing finite-precision sensors and actuators interacting with their environment under bounded inertial delays. The model permits only linear flow constraints but the invariants and guards can be any computable function.

This computational model was proposed by Manindra Agrawal and P. S. Thiagarajan. This model is more realistic and also computationally amenable than the currently popular modeling paradigm of linear hybrid automaton.

External links
  Formalization and theory behind the model
Reachability Analysis of Lazy Linear Hybrid Automata Research

Automata (computation)
Models of computation